Elaphrothrips tuberculatus is a species of tube-tailed thrips in the family Phlaeothripidae. It is found in North America.

References

Further reading

 
 
 
 

Phlaeothripidae
Articles created by Qbugbot
Insects described in 1908